Grey Skies is the title for the first and only album released by Crooked Lettaz, the Jackson, Mississippi duo composed of Kamikaze and David Banner. The album was released on April 20, 1999, by independent label, Penalty Recordings, with manufacturing and distribution handled by Tommy Boy Music.

Grey Skies featured two singles: the 1998 one-track, promotional-only single, "Caught Up In The Game", followed by the 1999 two-track single, "Firewater" (featuring Noreaga)/"Get Crunk" (featuring Pimp C from UGK).

The album would peak at #75 on the Billboard's R&B chart.

After Crooked Lettaz disbanded, both Kamikaze and David Banner would go on to have successful solo careers occasionally reuniting on various solo releases.

Track listing

References

1999 debut albums
Albums produced by David Banner
David Banner albums